Samuel Osiński (died 1649) of Radwan coat of arms was a high-ranking noble (szlachcic) in the Polish–Lithuanian Commonwealth.

Biography 
Osiński was born to the courtier Pawła, a devout Calvinist.

Around 1633, he became high commander of the of King Władysław IV Waza. In 1641, he became the owner of royal lands in Brest. The next year, he accompanied the king on his journey to Lithuania, and in 1645 became oboźny of the Lithuanian Army.

References 

Polish nobility
1649 deaths
Polish people of the Smolensk War
Year of birth unknown